Jimmy, Jim or James Gooch may refer to:

Jimmy Gooch (footballer), English footballer
Jim Gooch (politician) in Kentucky House of Representatives
Jimmy Gooch (speedway rider) (1928–2011), speedway rider
James Gooch (psychoanalyst)
James Gooch, in Raid on Wells (1692)